Yuri Oliveira Lima (born 5 August 1994), simply known as Yuri, is a Brazilian footballer. Mainly a defensive midfielder, he can also play a central defender.

Club career

Audax
Born in São Paulo, Yuri joined Grêmio Osasco Audax in 2007, when the club was still known as PAEC. After a one-year loan at Palmeiras' under-20 side, he was promoted to the first team in 2015.

Yuri made his professional debut on 9 April 2015, starting in a 2–1 Campeonato Paulista away win against Bragantino. A day later, he was loaned to Audax Rio de Janeiro, a club which had the same ownership.

Returning to his parent club, Yuri was made a starter by Fernando Diniz during the 2016 campaign, as Audax reached the finals of Paulistão for the first time in their history. He contributed with 13 appearances during the tournament, as his side finished second.

Santos

On 13 May 2016, Yuri was involved in a negotiation with Santos, being linked to a loan move to the club. He would only sign his 18-month loan deal on 7 June, after renewing with Audax until 2020.

Yuri made his Série A debut on 15 June 2016, coming on as a late substitute for Caju in a 2–0 home win against Sport Recife. On 3 July he scored his first professional goal, netting the third in a 3–0 home win against Chapecoense.

Yuri started the 2017 campaign as a centre back, mainly as a cover to the absences of Gustavo Henrique, Luiz Felipe and David Braz, all injured. On 27 March of that year, Santos activated the buyout clause of R$ 800,000 on his contract and signed him permanently. His new contract will start after the expiration of the loan deal.

Yuri made his Copa Libertadores debut on 19 April 2017, coming on as a late substitute for Bruno Henrique in a 0–0 away draw against Independiente Santa Fe. He spent the rest of the campaign as a backup to Alison, Renato and new signing Matheus Jesus.

On 14 January 2018, Yuri extended his contract with Santos until December 2020, after cutting ties with Audax. However, he was rarely used by managers Jair Ventura and Cuca during the campaign.

Fluminense
On 8 May 2019, despite featuring more regularly under new manager Jorge Sampaoli, Yuri was loaned to fellow first division side Fluminense, until December. On 30 December, his agent confirmed a permanent three-year deal with Flu.

Cuiabá (loan)
On 26 May 2021, Yuri was loaned to fellow top tier Cuiabá until the end of the season.

Personal life
Yuri's twin brother Yan is also a footballer. Also a midfielder, he too was groomed at Audax.

Career statistics

References

External links
Santos FC profile 

1994 births
Living people
Footballers from São Paulo
Brazilian twins
Twin sportspeople
Brazilian footballers
Association football defenders
Association football midfielders
Campeonato Brasileiro Série A players
Campeonato Brasileiro Série B players
Grêmio Osasco Audax Esporte Clube players
Santos FC players
Fluminense FC players
Cuiabá Esporte Clube players
Esporte Clube Juventude players
Mirassol Futebol Clube players